Taste of Love is the tenth extended play by South Korean girl group Twice. It was released on June 11, 2021, through JYP Entertainment and Republic Records. Marketed as the group's tenth "mini album" release, it consists of six tracks, including the lead single "Alcohol-Free".

Background 
On April 19, 2021, it was reported that Twice were in the final stages of preparing for their comeback slated for June and had plans of filming a music video on Jeju Island. The reports were officially confirmed by the group's Korean label, JYP Entertainment, sharing that official details would be released along with a fixed schedule. It is the group's first comeback as a nine-piece group after member Jeongyeon took a break from activities due to anxiety issues. The lead single, "Alcohol-Free", was pre-released on June 9.

Composition 
Taste of Love is a 6-track summer-themed EP that features various genres such as hip hop and bossa nova. The opening track and lead single, "Alcohol-Free", recounts the magical moments of falling in love while comparing it to the feeling of getting drunk. It was written by J. Y. Park and Lee Hae-sol. The seventh track "Cry for Me" (English ver.) was released only in physical editions of "Taste of Love".

Release and promotion 
Taste of Love was released worldwide on June 11, 2021, through JYP Entertainment and Republic Records. In celebration of the comeback, the group held an online live broadcast before the release of "Alcohol-Free" to talk about the album, the preparations, and the behind-the-scenes. The EP was preceded by its lead single "Alcohol-Free" and its music video, which was released on June 9, 2021.

Marketing 
On May 3, Twice released the first poster for their upcoming EP, Taste of Love, through the group's various social media accounts. On May 9, a preview of the physical album content was shared and pre-orders began the following day. On May 31, the EP's tracklist was posted along with the album trailer. A series of group teaser images were unveiled on Twice's social media accounts on May 21, while individual teaser images were released from June 1 to 3. On June 7 and 8, the music video teasers for "Alcohol-Free" were published. An album preview with snippets of the EP's tracks was uploaded on June 9. Twice appeared on Melon Station's Today's Music and shared stories behind the making of the EP on June 11. On the same day, Twice released an exclusive playlist on Spotify, guiding listeners through the group's creative process track-by-track.

Live performances 
Twice performed "Alcohol-Free" on The Ellen DeGeneres Show on June 9.

Critical reception 

Upon its release, Taste of Love received positive responses from music critics, who praised Twice's musical growth towards a more mature sound while maintaining their signature catchiness. On Metacritic, which assigns a normalized score out of 100 to ratings from publications, the album received a mean score of 77 based on 5 reviews, indicating "generally favorable reviews".

AllMusic's David Crone called Taste of Love a "bundle of summer anthems with the vivid emotions of summertime passion", which comes as a result of its production, "swooning vocals", and the "breezy yet seductive sonic direction". It was given a 75 out of 100 rating by Beats Per Minute, citing that it is "a set of six slickly-produced songs that take place from sunset into the hazy summer night". In a 7.3 out of ten review for Pitchfork, Joshua Minsoo Kim said that it overflows with "moments of clear, magnetic confidence", and said that the group's devotion to breeziness cements it as one of K-pop's best summer albums.

Angela Patricia Suacillo of NME praised the group's versatility in concept execution and vocal performances. Describing it as an "upbeat, groovy exploration", the reviewer called it one of Twice's "more powerful" releases for showing their growth as artists and involvement in the creative process, yet criticized "Alcohol-Free" for lacking excitement. Similarly, IZM critic Kim Seong-yeop found "Alcohol-Free" lackluster, saying "the simple melody leaves a boring taste", however, the critic was more optimistic of the b-side tracks. In a mixed review, Ana Clara Ribeiro of PopMatters noted that while Taste of Love is a good album, it does not have the "enough 'wow' for its own good".

Year-end lists

Commercial performance 
Taste of Love debuted on the weekly Gaon Album Chart with a number 2 position. On June 11, it was reported that it had surpassed 530,000 pre-order sales, becoming a half-million seller before its release and their third release to surpass 500,000 sales. In the United States, Taste of Love debuted at number six on the Billboard 200 chart with 46,000 album-equivalent units, of which 3,000 were calculated from the album's 5.09 million on-demand streams, while 43,000 were pure sales. It was the group's third release to enter the chart and their highest peak. Moreover, the EP claimed the top spot on both Billboard World Albums and Top Album Sales charts, earning their second No. 1 in the former chart. Selling over 500,000 copies, the EP certified double platinum by the Korea Music Content Association (KMCA) in August 2021.

Track listing 

Notes

Personnel 
Credits adapted from Melon and album liner notes.

Musicians 

 Twice – vocals 
 Dahyun – lyricist 
 Jihyo – lyricist 
 Nayeon – lyricist 
 Sana – lyricist 
 A Wright – producer 
 Alida Garpestad Peck – producer 
 Anne Judith Wik – producer 
 Bloodline – arranger 
 Chloe Latimer – producer 
 Chris Mears – producer 
 Distract – background vocals 
 Erik Smaaland – arranger, producer 
 Glow – producer 
 Go Tae-young – guitar 
 Ham Chun-ho – guitar 
 Heize – lyricist 
 Jade Thirlwall – producer 
 Karen Poole – producer 
 Kim Yeon-seo – background vocals 
 Kristoffer Tømmerbakke – arranger, producer 
 Lee Hae-sol – arranger, instrumentation 
 Lee Hyun-do – arranger, keyboard, producer 
 Lee Na-il – string arranger and conductor 
 Melanie Joy Fontana – producer 
 Michel "Lindgren" Schulz – producer 
 Nermin Harambašić – producer 
 On the String – strings 
 J. Y. Park "The Asiansoul" – arranger, instrumentation , lyricist , producer 
 Rebbi James – producer 
 Red Triangle – arranger 
 Rick Parkhouse – bass, producer 
 George Tizzard – guitar, keyboard, producer 
 Robbie McDade – producer 
 Ronny Vidar Svendsen – arranger, producer 
 Ryan Tedder – producer 
 Sophia Pae – background vocals , lyricist 
 Sophie "Frances" Cooke – producer

Technical 

 Chris Gehringer – mastering 
 Eastbeam – vocal editing 
 Eom Se-hee – recording 
 Fabiotheasian – vocal editing 
 Im Hong-jin – mixing 
 Jiyoung Shin – additional editing 
 Joo Ye-chan – recording assistant 
 Ku Hye-jin – recording 
 Kwon Nam-woo – mastering 
 Lee Hae-sol – programming 
 Lee Hyun-do – programming 
 Lee Sang-yeop – digital editing, mixing engineering , recording 
 Lee Tae-seop – mixing 
 Oh Seong-geun – strings recording 
 Park Eun-jung – mixing , recording 
 J. Y. Park "The Asiansoul" – digital editing, vocal editing 
 Rick Parkhouse – programming 
 Sim Eun-jee – digital editing , vocal editing 
 Sophia Pae – vocal director

Charts

Weekly charts

Year-end charts

Certifications and sales 

|}

Accolades

Release history

See also 
 List of certified albums in South Korea

References 

2021 EPs
Korean-language EPs
Twice (group) EPs
Republic Records EPs
JYP Entertainment EPs